A stain repellent is a product added to fabric in order to prevent stains.

Stains 
Stains on fabrics are classified into three types: water-based stains and oil-based stains or a mix of both.

Stain repellant fabrics 
Fabrics are finished with certain finishes that do not allow unwanted stains or that will wash out in simple laundry.

Chemicals 
Mostly larger PFCAs such as perfluorooctanoic acid (PFOA) are used in stain repellancy. It is also known colloquially as C8. PFOA is a product of health concern and subject to regulatory action and voluntary industrial phase-outs.

Alternative chemistry 
There are chemicals which are based on C8 free chemistry that may be used as an alternative to PFOA, but those are less durable.

See also
Fluorosurfactant
Perfluorobutanesulfonic acid
Perfluorooctanesulfonic acid
Scotchgard

Notes

Textile treatments